KWVE-FM (107.9 FM) is a commercial radio station licensed to San Clemente, California, broadcasting to the Greater Los Angeles area and northern San Diego County. KWVE-FM airs Christian radio programming with an emphasis on Bible teaching and Christian music of the praise and worship genre. The station is owned by Calvary Chapel Costa Mesa, with its transmitter atop Santiago Peak and studios in the church-owned Logos Building in Santa Ana, adjacent to the church campus.

Most of the teaching programs on the station are locally produced by Calvary Chapel pastors. The praise and worship music, as described on the station's website, is meant to "lead one into the worship of God without attracting too much attention to the music itself." It also has two hours of Christian children's programming on Saturday mornings.

History
The El Camino Broadcasting Corporation built KAPX and signed it on in November 1971. By 1977, it aired a contemporary middle-of-the-road format. That November, Radio Apex bought KAPX and changed its call letters to KWVE-FM, becoming a beautiful music station known as K-Wave.

By the early 1980s, KWVE-FM was a secular commercial music station that received poor ratings, except in the evening drive slot when it played cutting-edge punk rock and new wave music which pulled high Arbitron ratings. In 1982, KWVE-FM sold the 7 p.m. to midnight timeslot to Calvary Chapel Costa Mesa as well as Sundays from 5 a.m. to noon; in 1984, the station fired most of its disc jockeys and went to syndicated music programming. In 1985, Calvary Chapel bought the station. The Calvary offer beat two competing bidders because it was an all-cash offer.

The church took over on April 15, expanding the Christian programming to its current 24-hour format while retaining the KWVE call letters and K-Wave brand. KWVE-FM advertises itself as "The Wave of Living Water", in reference to its wave-themed moniker and to the New Testament phrase "living water", a term for salvation through Jesus Christ.
For most of its existence, the station's call letters were simply KWVE, without the FM suffix. That changed in 2009 when Calvary Chapel purchased a defunct Christian AM radio station, KGDP in Oildale, California and renamed it KWVE (now KGSV), simulcasting the FM signal into the Bakersfield radio market. As a result, the original KWVE was legally renamed KWVE-FM.

KWVE-FM is sometimes confused with a similarly named secular smooth adult contemporary radio station in Los Angeles, KTWV (94.7 FM), known as "94.7 The Wave" and owned by Entercom. Then-owner Metromedia converted rock-formatted KMET to KTWV and "The Wave" on February 14, 1987, nearly two years after the launch of KWVE-FM's current format. Both stations emphasize their FM frequencies to distinguish themselves from each other, and during the 1990s KWVE-FM kept on hand in its broadcast booth KTWV's request line and business numbers as a courtesy to listeners mistakenly calling into the wrong station.

The K-Wave Radio Network
K-Wave operates two other feeds outside the Los Angeles area.

KSDW (88.9 FM) in San Diego, K245AI (96.9 FM), and KWTH (91.3 FM) in Barstow, California; 
KOMP-HD2 and K251BS (98.1 FM) Las Vegas, and K287BE (105.3 FM) Mountain Pass.

(Special note:  As of Midnight local time on Friday, May 28, K251BS (98.1 FM) Las Vegas will no longer broadcast K-Wave programming.)

Together they create continuous signal coverage from San Diego County, California, through Orange County, California and Los Angeles County, California to Las Vegas, Nevada along the Interstate 15 highway corridor.

The church acquired the three stations on August 11, 2011. These stations were previously owned and programmed by other ministries affiliated with the Calvary Chapel fellowship of churches. KWTH and K284AU were originally a part of the Living Proof Radio Network when they signed on the air in 2006, but later were affiliated with The KRTM Radio Network from October 27, 2010 until August 16, 2011. K295AJ originally broadcast at 106.9 FM as part of the Calvary Satellite Network for many years before signing off in June 2009. It returned to the air in November 2010 at 98.1 FM as a part of the KRTM Radio Network.

25th anniversary
On April 15 and 16, 2010, Calvary Chapel Costa Mesa celebrated the 25th anniversary of its purchase of KWVE-FM and the station's Christian talk and music format with two evening concerts in the church sanctuary. The concerts featured Love Song, a Christian rock band founded at Calvary Chapel and popular during the Jesus Movement of the early 1970s, and messages from senior pastor Chuck Smith.

Website attacked by hackers
Beginning on October 17, 2010 visitors to KWVE-FM's website began complaining on the station's Facebook fan page that they could not access either the home page or the Flash Player live stream. The station replied that the web server experienced a hacker attack and the entire site had to be taken down while they cleared the hardware of malignant code and rebuilt the site "from the ground up". As of November 1 the site and live stream were back in operation.

Calvary Chapel Music Channel
On August 7, 2011 KWVE-FM announced on its website and Facebook page the creation of the Calvary Chapel Music Channel, a commercial-free iTunes channel streaming the station's music 24 hours a day.

EAS issues
KWVE-FM is the Local Primary station of the Emergency Alert System (EAS) for Orange County, meaning that all radio stations and cable systems in the area must relay emergency information and Required Monthly Tests from KWVE-FM, when activated.

On September 15, 2009, the Federal Communications Commission fined Calvary Chapel $5,000 for a botched EAS test on October 19, 2008—on that date, the station conducted a Required Monthly Test (RMT) by mistake, instead of the scheduled Required Weekly Test. The operator aborted the test midway through, leading the station to fail to broadcast a code to indicate the end of the test, causing all stations and cable systems in the area to broadcast KWVE-FM's programming until those stations took their equipment offline or their EAS equipment had timed out (after two minutes).

After the fine was levied, every state broadcast association in the United States submitted a joint letter to the FCC, protesting against the fine, saying that the FCC could have handled the matter better. On November 13, 2009, the FCC rescinded its fine against KWVE-FM, but had still admonished the station for broadcasting an unauthorized RMT, as well as omitting the code to end the test.

On September 21, 2017, a glitch during a test conducted by KWVE caused the station to accidentally omit the end-of-message tone, which caused portions of Chuck Swindoll's Insight for Living program to accidentally be relayed to local cable providers. In the audio relayed, Swindoll was heard quoting a Biblical verse, 2 Timothy 3:1, and stating that "extremely violent times" would come, which led viewers hearing the audio out of context to believe that it had been hacked to inform of an impending apocalypse.

References

External links
KWVE-FM Official Website

WVE-FM
Radio stations established in 1971
Mass media in Orange County, California